RUMT may refer to:
 Hendrika van Rumt (1897–1985), Dutch gymnast
 TRNA (uracil-5-)-methyltransferase, an enzyme